Microtis arenaria, commonly known as the notched onion orchid, is a species of orchid endemic to south-eastern Australia. It has a single hollow, onion-like leaf and up to sixty scented, crowded yellowish-green flowers. It is widespread and common, growing in a wide variety of habitats.

Description
There is an irregularly-shaped callus in the centre of the labellum. Flowering occurs from September to December.

Taxonomy and naming
Microtis arenaria was first formally described in 1840 by John Lindley and the description was published in The Genera and Species of Orchidaceous Plants. The specific epithet (arenaria) is a Latin word meaning "sandy".

Distribution and habitat
The notched onion orchid is widespread and common in south-eastern New South Wales, throughout Victoria, Tasmania and south-eastern South Australia. It grows in a range of habitats from sandhills to rocky inland outcrops but is most common in coastal sand.

References

External links
 
 

arenaria
Endemic orchids of Australia
Orchids of New South Wales
Orchids of South Australia
Orchids of Tasmania
Orchids of Victoria (Australia)
Plants described in 1840